Ross Kemp: Battle for the Amazon is a documentary series shown on Sky1. The show is hosted by actor Ross Kemp, best known for his role of Grant Mitchell in the show EastEnders.

External links

2010 British television series debuts
2010 British television series endings
Sky UK original programming
Television series by Endemol
Television series by Tiger Aspect Productions